The War Merit Cross was a military decoration of the Principality of Lippe.  Established on 8 December 1914, by Leopold IV, Prince of Lippe, it could be awarded to combatants and to non-combatants for significant contributions to the war effort.  The cross was awarded approximately 18,000 times to combatants and 1,100 times to non-combatants.

Appearance
The War Merit Cross is a gilded bronze cross pattée.  On the obverse of the cross in the center is the Rose of Lippe surrounded by a laurel wreath.  In the upper arm of the cross, at the top of the wreath is the crowned cipher of Leopold IV.  The lower arm bears the date 1914.  On the reverse are the words FÜR, AUSZEICHNUNG IM, KRIEGE (for distinction in wartime) inscribed in three lines respectively, on the upper, horizontal, and lower arms of the cross.

Awards to combatants have a yellow ribbon with red and white edges.  Non-combat awards of the Cross hang from a white ribbon with edges of yellow and red.

Notable recipients
Manfred von Richthofen
Gerd von Rundstedt
Rupprecht, Crown Prince of Bavaria
Prince Leopold of Bavaria
Jürgen Stroop

References

Orders, decorations, and medals of Lippe
Principality of Lippe
Awards established in 1914